The Nelson Wheeler Whipple House is an adobe house in Salt Lake City, Utah, United States built in 1854. Whipple was born in Sanford, New York in 1818, converting to Mormonism in 1844 and moving to Nauvoo, Illinois. After fleeing Nauvoo in 1846, Whipple lived in Garden Grove, Iowa until 1850, when he and his family moved to Salt Lake City. There he acquired two  more wives and 17 children, providing wood shingles for the Mormon Tabernacle and keeping a diary that has become an important historical resource.

The adobe is covered by stucco, with a Federal-style entrance and a gabled roof. It was placed on the National Register of Historic Places on September 26, 1979.

See also
 
 National Register of Historic Places listings in Salt Lake City

References

External links
 
 

Houses on the National Register of Historic Places in Utah
Houses completed in 1854
Houses in Salt Lake City
Historic American Buildings Survey in Utah
National Register of Historic Places in Salt Lake City